Fantasy is a genre of fiction.

Fantasy, Fantasie, or Fantasies may also refer to:

Arts and entertainment

Music
 Fantasia (music), a free-form musical composition
 Fantasie (Widmann), a 1993 composition for solo clarinet by Jörg Widmann
 Fantasie in C (Schumann), an 1836 composition for solo piano by Robert Schumann
 Fantasy (group), a 1980s American vocal group
 Fantasy Records, an American record label
 Fantasy Studios, a defunct studio operated by Fantasy Records

Albums
 Fantasie (Münchener Freiheit album), a German-language album, 1988
 Fantasie (Nicola Benedetti album), 2009
 Fantasies (album), by Metric, 2009
 Fantasy (Candy Lo album), 2001
 Fantasy (Carole King album), 1973
 Fantasy (Jay Chou album), 2001
 Fantasy (Lena Philipsson album) or the title song, 1993
 Fantasy (Lightning Dust album), 2013
 Fantasy (M83 album), 2023
 Fantasy (Münchener Freiheit album), an English-language album, 1988
 Fantasy (Ramsey Lewis album), 1985
 Fantasy (Regine Velasquez album), 2010
 Fantasy (Gensoukyoku), by Akina Nakamori, 1983
 Fantasy, by Manau, 2013
 Fantasy, a single album by Fei, or the title song, 2016
 Fantasy, an EP by Chloe Kohanski, 2019
 Fantasy, an EP by No Rome, 2013
 Fantasy: Mariah Carey at Madison Square Garden, a video, 1996

Songs
 "Fantasy" (Aldo Nova song), 1982
 "Fantasy" (Alice Nine song), 2006
 "Fantasy" (Appleton song), 2002
 "Fantasy" (Bashy song), 2010
 "Fantasy" (Danny Fernandes song), 2008
 "Fantasy" (DyE song), 2011
 "Fantasy" (Earth, Wind & Fire song), 1978; covered by Black Box, 1990
 "Fantasy" (George Michael song), 1990
 "Fantasy" (Mariah Carey song), 1995
 "Fantasy" (Nadia Ali song), 2010
 "Fantasy" (Tesla Boy song), 2012
 "Fantasy", by Bazzi from Cosmic, 2018
 "Fantasy", by the Blizzards from A Public Display of Affection, 2006
 "Fantasy", by Bone Thugs from New Waves, 2017
 "Fantasy", by Do or Die from Pimpin' Ain't Dead, 2003
 "Fantasy", by Exile, 2010
 "Fantasy", by Gerard Kenny, 1980
 "Fantasy", by Meiko Nakahara, 1982
 "Fantasy", by Jolin Tsai from Muse, 2012
 "Fantasy", by MS MR from Secondhand Rapture, 2013
 "Fantasy", by Sekai no Owari, 2010
 "Fantasy", by Sofi Tukker, 2019
 "Fantasy", by Superfruit from Future Friends, 2017
 "Fantasy", by VIXX from Hades, 2016
 "Fantasy", by the xx from xx, 2009
 "The Fantasy", by 30 Seconds to Mars from A Beautiful Lie, 2005

Periodicals
 Fantasy magazine, any magazine which publishes primarily fantasy fiction
 Fantasy (1938 magazine), a 1938–1939 British pulp science fiction magazine
 Fantasy (1946 magazine), a 1946–1947 British science fiction magazine
 Fantasy Magazine (1953), an American fantasy magazine published in 1953 as one of John Raymond's science fiction magazines
 Fantasy Magazine (2005), American online fantasy and science fiction magazine published from 2005 to 2011 and 2020 to present

Publishers
 Fantasy Press, a defunct American fantasy and science fiction publishing house, founded in 1946 by Lloyd Arthur Eshbach
 Fantasy Press (poetry), an English publisher of poetry 1951–1959
 Fantasy Productions, a German book and role-playing game publishing company founded in 1983
 Fantasy Publishing Company, Inc., a defunct American science fiction and fantasy small press, founded in 1946 by William L. Crawford

Other media
 Fantasies (film), a 1981 German-made English-language drama film
 Fantasy (game show), a 1982–1983 American game show
 Fantasy (video game), a 1981 action/adventure arcade game 
 "Fantasy", a poem by Patti Smith from her 1972 book Seventh Heaven

People
 Fantasy (gamer), Jung Myung-Hoon (born 1991), South Korean professional StarCraft player
 Fantasy (Mini-Estrella) (born 1989), Mexican masked professional wrestler
 Sensei (wrestler) or Fantasy (born 1978), Mexican masked professional wrestler

Other uses
 Fantasy (psychology), a range of mental experiences mediated by the faculty of imagination
 Sexual fantasy, a fantasy that stirs a person's sexuality
 Fantasy, the drug GHB
 Fantasy-class cruise ship, a class of ships operated by Carnival Cruise Line
 Carnival Fantasy, a Carnival Cruise Line ship 1988–2020
 Fantasy, a women's fragrance endorsed by Britney Spears

See also
 
 Fantasia (disambiguation)
 Fantasio (disambiguation)
 Phantasm (disambiguation)
 Phantasy (disambiguation)